Martin J. "Mike" Pasqualetti is a professor of geography in the School of Geographical Sciences and Urban Planning at Arizona State University in Tempe, Arizona. He is also a member of the graduate faculty on Global Technology and Development at ASU Polytechnic, and a Senior Sustainability Scholar the Global Institute of Sustainability. He pioneered the study of "Energy Landscapes," which interprets the role of human energy demand in reshaping natural landscapes.

Education
Pasqualetti received his B.A. in Geography from the University of California, Berkeley; his M.A. in Geography and Anthropology from LSU in Baton Rouge, and his Ph.D. from the University of California, Riverside.

Public service
He was appointed twice by two different Arizona governors as chair of the Arizona Solar Energy Advisory Council. He is regarded as an expert on renewable energy and energy ties between the United States and Mexico.  He was an appointed member of the Arizona Board of Geographic and Historic Names, leading the successful effort to change the name of a Phoenix landmark from Squaw Peak to Piestewa Peak in honor of Lori Piestewa, the first Native American women to be killed in action.

Publications
Dr. Pasqualetti has published books on wind power, nuclear power plant decommissioning, nuclear energy hazards, landscape development, and 75 articles on energy and other topics, including solar energy, wind energy, geothermal energy, nuclear energy, oil sands, energy security, and energy landscapes. The following is a selection of his published work:

Books
 Nuclear Power: Assessing and Managing Hazardous Technology, editor and contributor (with K. David Pijawka) and contributor. Westview Press. 1984
 Nuclear Decommissioning and Society, editor and contributor. Routledge Press. 1990.
 The Evolving Landscape: Homer Aschmann's Geography, editor and contributor. Johns Hopkins University Press. 1997
 Wind Power in View: Landscapes of Power in a Crowded World, editor and contributor (with Paul Gipe and Robert Righter). Academic Press. 2002

References

External links
 Pasqualetti's website at ASU

Year of birth missing (living people)
Living people
American geographers
Arizona State University faculty
Louisiana State University alumni
University of California, Berkeley alumni
University of California, Riverside alumni
People associated with renewable energy
People associated with nuclear power